A Carlow County Council election was held in County Carlow in Ireland on 24 May 2019 as part of that year's local elections. All 18 councillors were elected for a five-year term of office from three local electoral areas (LEAs) by single transferable vote.

The 2018 boundary review committee recommended significant changes to the LEAs used in the 2014 elections due to terms of references requiring a maximum of seven councillors in each LEA and changes in population revealed in the 2016 census. These changes were made by the Minister of State with special responsibility for Local Government and Electoral Reform John Paul Phelan.

Fianna Fáil gained an additional seat to emerge level with Fine Gael on 6 seats apiece and a higher share of the vote. Sinn Féin had a poor election losing two seats, and Cllr John Cassin was re-elected as an Independent. Labour retained two seats, while Adrienne Wallace, who contested Ireland South for Solidarity–People Before Profit in the European Parliament election held on the same day, gained a seat for the party.

Results by party

Results by local electoral area

Carlow

Muinebeag

Tullow

Results by gender

Footnotes

Sources

References

2019 Irish local elections
2019